The Secret of the Swamp is a 1916 American drama film written and directed by Lynn Reynolds. The film stars George Hernandez, Myrtle Gonzalez, Fred Church, Frank MacQuarrie, Val Paul and Countess Du Cello. The film was released on July 31, 1916, by Bluebird Photoplays, Inc.

Plot
Chet Wells, a poor farmer who rents land from Deacon Todd, falls in love with neighbor Emily Burke, who often comes to his farmhouse to look after Chet's invalid mother. However, Emily's father wants her to marry Allan Waite, a local man of means. Chet's hopeless situation becomes even moreso when his mother dies and the deacon turns him out of his house, so he abandons his love for Emily and leaves for the timberlands with hopes of making his fortune. Meanwhile, the deacon and Emily's father, Major Burke, become involved in a land dispute, and one night, as the deacon takes down a fence in order to let his cattle graze on his neighbor's land, the major fires buckshot in his direction. The next day, Deacon Todd has disappeared, and Major Burke, seeing vultures circling over a nearby swamp, fears he has killed him. When he discovers some scattered bones picked clean by animals, he keeps quiet about what he believes is murder, although Emily soon learns of his guilt when she hears him muttering in his drunken slumber. When Chet hears about the incident, he returns to take the blame in order to spare the Burkes any embarrassment, and this gesture makes Emily forget all about her sweetheart and fall in love with Chet instead. Then, just before Chet can be convicted, the deacon appears in a Model T Ford and reveals that after the buckshot narrowly missed him, he left town for a few days to purchase an automobile. It is soon discovered that the deacon's remains are really those of a cow that got stuck in the swamp.

Cast          
George Hernandez as Major Burke
Myrtle Gonzalez as Emily Burke
Fred Church as Allan Waite
Frank MacQuarrie as Deacon Todd
Val Paul as Chet Wells
Countess Du Cello as His Mother 
Lule Warrenton as Deacon's Housekeeper
Jack Curtis as The Sheriff

References

External links
 

1916 films
1910s English-language films
Silent American drama films
1916 drama films
Universal Pictures films
Films directed by Lynn Reynolds
American silent feature films
American black-and-white films
1910s American films